The 1982 Spanish general election was held on Thursday, 28 October 1982, to elect the 2nd Cortes Generales of the Kingdom of Spain. All 350 seats in the Congress of Deputies were up for election, as well as 208 of 254 seats in the Senate.

The election was called several months ahead of schedule on 27 August 1982, by the then Prime Minister Leopoldo Calvo-Sotelo, amid poor opinion poll ratings and severe infighting within his party, the Union of the Democratic Centre (UCD), that had seen the splits of former prime minister Adolfo Suárez's Democratic and Social Centre (CDS), Óscar Alzaga's People's Democratic Party (PDP) and the Democratic Action Party (PAD) of former minister Francisco Fernández Ordóñez. The closing legislature had been characterized by political instability and the effects of an economic downturn resulting from the 1979 oil crisis: Suárez himself had resigned the premiership in January 1981 as a result of the ongoing UCD crisis, a military coup d'etat attempt had been thwarted during Calvo-Sotelo's investiture on 23 February 1981, and the UCD had become increasingly isolated during the administrative set up of the so-called "state of the autonomies", both parliamentarily—a result of its minority status and continuous defections—and politically, having been routed in every regional election held since 1979: the Basque Country, Catalonia, Galicia and Andalusia. Calvo-Sotelo himself had chosen not to run for re-election.

The Spanish Socialist Workers' Party (PSOE) led by Felipe González won the largest landslide victory in a Spanish democratic election, with 48.1% of the vote and a strong majority of 202 out of 350 seats in the Congress, by running a mainstream modern social democratic campaign and appealing to political change. The UCD, on the other hand, was decimated, losing 93% of its 1979 seats and roughly 80% of its 1979 vote—still the worst defeat that a sitting government has suffered since the restoration of democracy, and one of the worst defeats ever suffered by a governing party in the Western world. The right-wing People's Alliance (AP), led into the election by former Francoist minister Manuel Fraga, benefitted greatly from the UCD's losses, becoming the main opposition party to the Socialists with slightly over 100 seats and 26.4% of the vote. Adolfo Suárez's CDS had a modest entry into the Congress with 2 seats and 2.9% of the vote, while the Communist Party of Spain (PCE) vote plummeted, suffering from tactical voting to the PSOE. Turnout remains, at 79.97%, the highest ever recorded in a general election held in Spain to date. The 1982 election was the last general election to be held on a day other than Sunday.

González took office on 2 December, heading the first government in 43 years in which none of its members had served under Francoism.

Overview

Electoral system
The Spanish Cortes Generales were envisaged as an imperfect bicameral system. The Congress of Deputies had greater legislative power than the Senate, having the ability to vote confidence in or withdraw it from a prime minister and to override Senate vetoes by an absolute majority of votes. Nonetheless, the Senate possessed a few exclusive (yet limited in number) functions—such as its role in constitutional amendment—which were not subject to the Congress' override. Voting for the Cortes Generales was on the basis of universal suffrage, which comprised all nationals over 18 years of age and in full enjoyment of their political rights.

For the Congress of Deputies, 348 seats were elected using the D'Hondt method and a closed list proportional representation, with an electoral threshold of three percent of valid votes—which included blank ballots—being applied in each constituency. Seats were allocated to constituencies, corresponding to the provinces of Spain, with each being allocated an initial minimum of two seats and the remaining 248 being distributed in proportion to their populations, at a rate of approximately one seat per each 144,500 inhabitants or fraction greater than 70,000. Ceuta and Melilla were allocated the two remaining seats, which were elected using plurality voting. The use of the D'Hondt method might result in a higher effective threshold, depending on the district magnitude.

As a result of the aforementioned allocation, each Congress multi-member constituency was entitled the following seats:

For the Senate, 208 seats were elected using an open list partial block voting system, with electors voting for individual candidates instead of parties. In constituencies electing four seats, electors could vote for up to three candidates; in those with two or three seats, for up to two candidates; and for one candidate in single-member districts. Each of the 47 peninsular provinces was allocated four seats, whereas for insular provinces, such as the Balearic and Canary Islands, districts were the islands themselves, with the larger—Majorca, Gran Canaria and Tenerife—being allocated three seats each, and the smaller—Menorca, Ibiza–Formentera, Fuerteventura, La Gomera, El Hierro, Lanzarote and La Palma—one each. Ceuta and Melilla elected two seats each. The law also provided for by-elections to fill seats vacated up to two years into the legislature. Additionally, autonomous communities could appoint at least one senator each and were entitled to one additional senator per each million inhabitants.

Election date
The term of each chamber of the Cortes Generales—the Congress and the Senate—expired four years from the date of their previous election, unless they were dissolved earlier. An election was required to be held within from 30 to 60 days after the date of expiry of the Cortes Generales. The previous election was held on 1 March 1979, which meant that the legislature's term would expire on 1 March 1983. An election was to take place no later than the sixtieth day from the expiry, setting the latest possible election date for the Cortes Generales on Saturday, 30 April 1983.

The prime minister had the prerogative to dissolve both chambers at any given time—either jointly or separately—and call a snap election, provided that no motion of no confidence was in process, no state of emergency was in force and that dissolution did not occur before one year had elapsed since the previous one. Additionally, both chambers were to be dissolved and a new election called if an investiture process failed to elect a prime minister within a two-month period from the first ballot. Barred this exception, there was no constitutional requirement for simultaneous elections for the Congress and the Senate. Still, as of  there has been no precedent of separate elections taking place under the 1978 Constitution.

Background

1979–81: Suárez's second term
The I Legislature started with the UCD victory in the 1979 election, in which it received an increased plurality of 168 seats, but still short of an absolute majority. In his investiture speech as Prime Minister on 30 March, Adolfo Suárez outlined the main areas of his policy, including the constitutional development involving the implementation and structuring of the State of Autonomies. Subsequently, in April 1979, the first municipal elections since the Second Spanish Republic were held, in which UCD won in the overall vote tally, but lost control of the main urban centers to PSOE-PCE alliances.

From 1979 the political situation in Spain began to deteriorate as a result of different factors. On one hand, an increase of terrorist activity by ETA, which resulted in 77 dead in 1979 and 95 in 1980, and the government's perceived inability to cope with the situation. Discontent among far-right groups with Suárez's democratic reforms resulted in the conspiration that would lead to the 23-F failed coup. The economic situation had also started to worsen after the start of the 1979 energy crisis and an increase on the oil barrel price. During Suárez's second term in office, inflation remained steady at 15% for several years, public deficit soared from 1.7% to 6% and the country's current account would register a net deficit of US$5 billion by 1980. The crisis also saw a sharp increase in unemployment, from 8.1% in March 1979 to 13.4% in March 1981.

The end of the political consensus that had dominated the Transition was confirmed with the launch by the PSOE of a tough opposition campaign. As the government was in minority status in the Congress, it was frequent for close votes to happen, with the government losing some of them at times. The harsh Socialist opposition reached a high-point in May 1980 when the PSOE presented a motion of no confidence on Suárez, with Socialist leader Felipe González accusing him and his government of "poor handling of the economic and social situation", as well as "repeatedly failing to fulfill campaign promises and breaching of agreements with other political forces and within the Cortes Generales themselves". While the motion was defeated—166 votes against, 152 in favour and 21 abstentions—it was regarded as a political victory of González. Suárez found himself politically isolated—its party being the only one voting against the motion—and the resulting debate, broadcast live on radio and later on television with high audience shares, gave González a pretext to expose the Socialist government program and to present the PSOE as a viable alternative to the UCD.

Growing division within UCD, with internal dissension and criticism gradually undermining the position of Suárez, also often resulted in the Prime Minister clashing with members of his own party. This was the result of the complex amalgamation of forces of very varying ideologies—social democrats, conservatives, liberals and christian democrats—into a party that was artificially created around the figure of Adolfo Suárez for the sole purpose of ruling. When UCD's popularity in opinion polls began to fall, internal tension began to flourish. The start of the UCD crisis would be a foreshadowing of what was to come in the later states of the I Legislature.

The autonomic process
The adoption of the first Statutes of Autonomy in Catalonia and the Basque Country led to the first regional elections in 1980, which gave a plurality to nationalist parties (CiU and PNV) and to disappointing results for UCD. Both Statutes were approved by the Catalan and Basque citizens through referendums with wide margins, complying with the procedure provided in article 151 of the Constitution for the "fast route" of accessing to autonomy, which allowed for an immediate assumption of full competences. The article 151 procedure was initially thought just for the three "historical nationalities" that had approved a "Statute of Autonomy" of its own during the Second Spanish Republic – namely, the Basque Country, Catalonia and Galicia (which would see its own Statute approved in 1981) – while the rest would accede to autonomy via article 143, assuming fewer powers through a slower and longer process and maybe not even establishing institutions of self-government.

Andalusia representatives, however, were firmly opposed to this and demanded for their region the maximum level of competences granted to the "historical nationalities". After a massive rally in support of autonomy held on 4 December 1977, a referendum was accepted to be organized for Andalusia to attain autonomy through the strict requirements of article 151, which required that in all of the provinces that were to constitute the new autonomy the 'Yes' had to win the support of over half of registered voters. The UCD, which was opposed to Andalusia accessing autonomy through article 151, called for abstention in the referendum, with the PSOE calling for a vote in favour. Eventually, in one of the eight provinces, Almería, the requirement of more than half of registered voters voting in favour was not met because of a high abstention, despite an overwhelming victory for the 'Yes' in Almería and the remainder of Andalusia. After several months of discussion, Adolfo Suárez and Felipe González reached an agreement whereby the Congress would approve an amendment allowing for Andalusia to take the "fast route" and have its Statute approved. As part of the agreement, no other region would use the procedure of article 151, but in exchange, all future autonomous communities would be allowed to establish a parliamentary system with all institutions of self-government. These 'autonomic pacts' between UCD and PSOE would later be formalized with the approving by Congress of the Organic Law of Armonization of the Autonomic Process (known by its acronym, LOAPA) in July 1982. The LOAPA provided for the devolution of competences to take place gradually, according to the ability of each region to assume them, so that in the end all of them possessed the same level of competences. The Law, however, was challenged as unconstitutional by the Catalan and Basque nationalists, with 14 out of its 38 articles being later invalidated by the Spanish Constitutional Court in August 1983.

However, the UCD image in Andalusia would remain seriously damaged from this point afterwards as a result of the party's opposition to the application of article 151. The UCD was also accused during the referendum campaign of obstructing the ratification process of the Statute and of failing to offer the needed democratic guarantees for the referendum's celebration. This, coupled with the ongoing national crisis affecting the party, would result in the UCD being nearly wiped out in the first Andalusian regional election of May 1982, in which the party would fall below 15% to a discreet third place. The PSOE, on the other hand, became very popular, seen as the party defending the Andalusian people's interests, and would become the dominant force in the region from that point onwards.

Suárez's resignation and 23-F
These factors combined with an increasing political isolation and alleged pressures from military sectors led to Adolfo Suárez announcing his resignation as Prime Minister and party leader on 29 January 1981. In his resignation speech Suárez did not elaborate on the reasons motivating his departure; only that he thought that his resignation was "more beneficial to Spain than his stay in the Presidency" and that he "did not want the democratic system to be a parenthesis in the history of the country". Proposed as his successor was Second Deputy Prime Minister and Economy Minister Leopoldo Calvo-Sotelo. It was rumoured that high-ranking military officials would have advised King Juan Carlos I to dismiss Suárez as a result of growing discontent with him from former ruling far-right sectors, the military and Suárez's party itself, though this was not confirmed.

Upon Suárez's resignation, events rushed. On 1 February, the Almendros Collective published a pro-coup article in the El Alcázar far-right newspaper; from 2 to 4 February, the monarchs visits the Basque Country, where Herri Batasuna MPs receive them with strong booing and several incidents, and on the same week, several people were found kidnapped or murdered by ETA. Amidst this tense climate, UCD's 2nd party congress is held from 6 to 9 February, where the party was internally divided. Agustín Rodríguez Sahagún was elected as new party President, and on 10 February Calvo-Sotelo was confirmed as PM candidate for the investiture vote to be held on 20 February. Calvo-Sotelo, however, was unable to command the required absolute majority of votes in the first round; as a result, a second round was postponed to 23 February.

It was in that day, during Calvo-Sotelo's investiture, that the different coup plots that had been plotting since the beginning of the Transition met in a coordinated action in what was known as the 23-F coup d'etat attempt. A group of Guardia Civil members under the command of Lieutenant Colonel Antonio Tejero assaulted the Congress of Deputies, kidnapping both the legislative and executive power within. At the same time, Lieutenant General Jaime Milans del Bosch ordered tanks onto the streets of Valencia and decreed a state of emergency.

The attempt eventually failed, however, as it did not count with the military's support. Key was King Juan Carlos I's role, broadcasting a message to Spaniards reassuring them of his personal opposition to the coup and his commitment with democracy and ordering the military rebels to stand down and surrender to constitutional order. Afterwards, Calvo-Sotelo was elected new Prime Minister with 186 votes, gaining the temporary support of CiU, the PAR and the entirety of AP as a result of the coup.

1981–82: Calvo-Sotelo's tenure
Leopoldo Calvo-Sotelo's one-year term in office was marked by several events which further undermined UCD's electoral base. The colza oil scandal of 1981, in which the illegal marketing of denatured rapeseed oil (intended for industrial use) for food purposes resulted in the mass poisoning of 20,000 people and the death of over 600. The legalization of divorce in mid-1981 met with criticism from the Catholic Church and the most conservative sectors within the UCD, which even demanded the resignation of Justice Minister Francisco Fernández Ordóñez, promoter of the law. The schism within UCD kept growing even after Suárez's departure from its leadership and desertions began to intensify. By early 1982, the UCD's parliamentary group was reduced to 164 in the Congress from 168 in the 1979 election (and with many within the group not following the party-line) and 108 in the Senate (out of the 121 it was entitled to), after Fernández Ordóñez split with his Democratic Action Party (PAD). By this point, defections and splits had begun to take a toll on the government's ability to win parliamentary votes, resulting in events such as the UCD defeat in the 1982 budget voting. Sotelo would assume full leadership over the UCD on 21 November 1981, succeeding Rodríguez Sahagún as party president.

Also during Calvo-Sotelo's tenure, Spain negotiated and accomplished its integration within NATO in May 1982. This move was met with the staunch opposition of the parliamentary left, headed by Felipe González' PSOE, which promised to hold a referendum on the issue if it ever came to government. But it also caused a rift between Calvo-Sotelo and former PM Adolfo Suárez, still a UCD MP, on the grounds that the incumbent Cabinet had not been duly informed of the possible consequences of an eventual Spanish entry into NATO, as well as the haste and rush with which the integration process was being carried out.

On 20 October 1981, the first Galician regional election was held. Seen as an UCD stronghold after its landslide wins in the region in both the 1977 and 1979 general election, the UCD was predicted an easy win, despite the already-expected loss in support. However, voters' weariness with the UCD's internal crisis and its management of the country resulted in a surprise win for the right-wing People's Alliance on an extremely low turnout (46.3%). While AP's victory was narrow (a 3-point margin), the result evidenced the enormous loss of support for the UCD in the urban areas and how AP was beginning to capitalize on its losses. This was followed by the party's collapse in the 23 May 1982 Andalusian election; garnering only 13% of the votes (from 32% in 1979) and also surpassed by AP, it was considered a disaster for the party. The dimensions of the electoral setback were unassailable (loss of 60% of its 1979 vote and displaced by AP as the main referent of the right in Spain's most populated region) and it had happened even after many of Calvo-Sotelo's Cabinet members had personally committed themselves to the election campaign (with up to 10 Ministers and Prime Minister Calvo-Sotelo himself publicly supporting the UCD candidate in Andalusia, Luis Merino). The national implications of the electoral results could not be ignored as the UCD had tried to do in Galicia, and the effects in national opinion polls were immediate; from that point onwards, the UCD began to trail both AP and the PSOE and was relegated to third party status.

Snap election
The Andalusian election debacle paved the way for the party's final decomposition in the run up to the next general election. Calvo-Sotelo announced in July 1982 his intention not to run as his party's main candidate for the premiership and resigned from the UCD presidency, but remained as Prime Minister. Replacing him as party candidate and leader was Landelino Lavilla, elected with a strong internal opposition (with the support of only 67% despite being the only party candidate). Concurrently, the UCD's continuous splits in the Congress (with its parliamentary group reduced to 150 out of 350) had, by the summer of 1982, deprived the party of a workable majority to govern until the end of the legislature in 1983, causing Calvo-Sotelo to announce the Cortes' dissolution and the call of a snap election for 28 October before the Parliament's reopening in September. Bill proposals such as the Statutes of Autonomy of Madrid, the Balearic Islands, Castile and León and Extremadura or the 1983 budget, scheduled to be approved throughout the autumn, had to be delayed until after the election as a result.

Adolfo Suárez, himself the UCD's founder, staged one of the most remarkable splits by founding the centrist Democratic and Social Centre (CDS) and announcing his intention to run on its own in the next general election. Also splitting from UCD was the new christian democrat People's Democratic Party (PDP) of Óscar Alzaga, which would run in coalition with AP. Had the Cortes reopened in September after the holidays as it was initially scheduled, the UCD parliamentary group in the Congress would have been down to 124, even less than a hypothetical sum of the PSOE and PAD parties (128 seats).

Parties and candidates
The electoral law allowed for parties and federations registered in the interior ministry, coalitions and groupings of electors to present lists of candidates. Parties and federations intending to form a coalition ahead of an election were required to inform the relevant Electoral Commission within fifteen days of the election call, whereas groupings of electors needed to secure the signature of at least one permille—and, in any case, 500 signatures—of the electorate in the constituencies for which they sought election, disallowing electors from signing for more than one list of candidates.

Below is a list of the main parties and coalitions which contested the election:

Campaign

Pre-election
One of the most discussed issues in the road to the 1982 general election was the parties' policy of electoral alliances. Fernández Ordóñez' PAD had already reached an agreement by the spring of 1982 to run under the PSOE banner, while talks for an eventual AP–PDP coalition were underway already before the Cortes' dissolution, being confirmed in early September. Initially confirmed was also the nationwide coalition between the UCD and the Liberal Democratic Party (PDL) of Antonio Garrigues Walker under the UCD banner; the PDL having been founded in July amidst the internal crisis of UCD. However, the UCD–PDL alliance broke apart because of "technical differences" in the making up of electoral lists, with the PDL opting for not contesting the election. Some sectors within UCD had also tried to ally itself with Suárez's CDS with little success as a result of the latter's refusal, with the UCD's general reluctance against any electoral coalition in which it was not dominant causing new internal clashes within the party, as the belief of it heading towards election defeat increased.

There were also voices within the party calling for a nationwide coalition with Manuel Fraga's AP, which was rejected by the party's leadership, although a coalition at the regional level between both parties for the Basque Country was confirmed on the basis of "exceptional circumstances" existing in the territory. People from the business and banking world, concerned about a hypothetical victory of the PSOE with an absolute majority, also voiced their support for an UCD–AP coalition, criticizing the centrists' rejection of such an agreement, while Manuel Fraga was confident in that "the natural majority [a hypothetical union of the Spanish centre-right electorate] will be realized, either from above or from below". However, Lavilla wanted to distance himself and his party from the right and appeal to the centre of the political spectrum, viewing AP as too right-wing for that purpose.

During the first days of October, preparations for a coup d'etat attempt scheduled for 27 October (on Election Day's eve) were unveiled and foiled. The plan was to stage a number of violent actions against different personalities, to culminate later with a great explosion in a block of military houses in Madrid. This would be blamed on ETA and the inefficiency in the fight against terrorism as a means to justify a military takeover. The importance of the coup attempt was downplayed by the media in order to avoid raising social unrest, and it hardly affected the election campaign starting on 7 October. PSOE Vice Secretary-General Alfonso Guerra, however, would state that the incorporation of the Army to democracy was to be one of the goals of a future PSOE government.

Party slogans

Development

PSOE

The Spanish Socialist Workers' Party centered its campaign on the perceived need for a political change in the Spanish government. Unlike the 1977 and 1979 campaigns, the PSOE resorted to a catch-all party strategy, presenting itself as the "only effective alternative to UCD". It used a single, simple and catchy slogan ("For change"), meant to simplify the party's message as well as to transmit confidence in the new government. Raised fists and singing of The Internationale also disappeared from PSOE's rallies. Instead, seeking to move away from its traditional left-wing stance and to appeal to a broader electorate through a more centrist platform, the party usually ended its rallies with a jingle ("We must change") centering on the message of "change". The PSOE also relied in a strong personalization around the figure of Felipe González, appealing to ethics and messages of hope as drivers of the political change, but also to show an image of party unity in contrast to the UCD's internal infighting of the previous years. The party's final campaign rally on 26 October, held in the University City of Madrid, was estimated to have gathered roughly half a million people.

Among the PSOE election pledges were the creation of 800,000 employments, the nationalization of banks in a critical economic situation and the decrease of retirement age from 69 to 64, as well as to establish the maximum working time at 40-hour week. It also proposed a wide range of social policies: raising taxes to higher incomes, increasing lowest-earning pensions, promotion of public companies, to increase control and monitoring of companies by workers, to expand unemployment insurances and to reduce social inequality through the social security. Regarding NATO, the PSOE was also a staunch advocate of Spain's exit from the organization, though eventually it would defend a 'Yes' vote in the 1986 referendum on NATO membership.

Leading all opinion polls and fresh from its success in the May Andalusian regional election, the PSOE was widely expected to win the election; its victory being so assured that all other parties' efforts were directed towards avoiding a Socialist absolute majority so that it had to govern through coalitions or agreements, rather than in winning the election themselves.

UCD

The Union of the Democratic Centre tried to campaign focusing on the values of the centre against the alleged radicalism of the PSOE and AP, the two of them had begun to polarize the political scene by 1982.

Nonetheless, the UCD campaign was plagued by organizational problems. No proper campaign chief was named, the messages were varied and confusing and the economic waste, despite being the best-funded campaign, was deemed unaffordable given the electoral prospects. No attempt for simplification of the party's message was made; their proposals consisting of dense and long texts to the simpler and more effective slogans of the other parties. Incumbent Prime Minister Leopoldo Calvo-Sotelo was mostly left out from the party campaign, and defections to other parties as well as the refusal to form a broad centre-right coalition with AP had left the UCD in a weak position to voters. Landelino Lavilla was also deemed to have poor public performances: in an opinion article published during the campaign on the Cambio 16 magazine it was noted how Lavilla's speeches were unable to incite any euphoria or to make clear any ideas.

Overall, the party campaign was criticised as having been carried out with reluctance and lack of conviction.

AP–PDP

The People's Alliance and the People's Democratic Party ran in a common ticket for this election, in what would be a foreshadowing of the future People's Coalition from 1983 to 1986. The coalition's communication strategy for the campaign revolved around two main ideas: emphasis on Manuel Fraga's leadership and in the coalition as the only viable alternative to the PSOE. The coalition strategy was also meant to present itself as an example of political cooperation, contrasting with UCD's disintegration. All in all, the purpose of the AP–PDP ticket was to turn itself into the main centre-right reference force of Spain. Manuel Fraga was also concerned in moderating his right-wing stance, avoiding themes such as death penalty or constitutional reform.

Among AP's election pledges were a tax reduction consisting in the suppression of the wealth tax, exemption from the income tax (IRPF) for incomes lower than 750,000 yearly pesetas, deduction of any economic amount intended for productive investments and the setting of an upper limit to individual tax burden. It also proposed the political immunity of Administration officials against successive government changes and a partial privatization of the social security system so that only the most basic levels of attendance would be maintained generally, with other benefits depending on what users paid (but providing extensions for the person attending home in each family and to young people unable to find employment after completing their studies). Finally, it advocated for completing the integration of Spain into NATO, ensuring full employment and to guide the cultural policy under christian humanism.

After its success in the 1981 Galician and 1982 Andalusian regional elections, all opinion polls pointed to AP becoming the main Spanish opposition party, but at a great distance from the PSOE.

Opinion polls

Results

Congress of Deputies

Senate

Outcome
With a record high turnout of 79.97%, the Spanish political landscape underwent an electoral earthquake. The ruling UCD was devastated; it lost 157 seats and fell to 11, a 93.5% loss from 1979. In terms of votes, it went from 6.3 million down to 1.4 million, a loss of 4.9 million votes or 77.8% of its 1979 vote, and plunged to 6.8% of the share to the 34.8% it had won in 1979—a loss of 80.5% of its share. Of its 11 seats, 5 were obtained in Galicia, 3 in Castile and León, 2 in the Canary Islands and only 1 in Madrid, winning no seats in all other regions. Incumbent Prime Minister Leopoldo Calvo-Sotelo, which stood in second place in the Madrid list, lost his seat—the only time in recent Spanish history that a sitting Prime Minister seeking re-election as MP was unseated. It was the worst defeat, both in absolute terms and in terms of percentage of seats lost, for a ruling party at the national level in Spain, and one of the worst defeats ever suffered by a governing party in any country at the time, rivaling only with the collapse of Christian Democracy at the 1994 Italian election or the Progressive Conservatives' downfall at the 1993 Canadian election.

The PSOE swept the popular vote in nearly all regions of the country—only AP and PNV wins in Galicia and the Basque Country denied them a clean sweep of the entire national territory. They won a majority of seats in every region but Galicia, La Rioja and the Balearic Islands, and obtained an astounding 60% in Spain's most populous region, Andalusia—a feat never to happen again. In Catalonia it obtained a 23-point lead over the second most-voted party, a result that would only be surpassed by the PSOE's own result in the 2008 election. Andalusia and Catalonia would become from that point onwards as the main strongholds of PSOE support, which was to remain the dominant political force in both regions in each general election until 2011. Overall, the PSOE won 202 seats—its best historical performance and the best performance of any party in a Spanish general election. This gave them an overwhelming majority in the Congress, nearly doubling the seat-count of its immediate competitor. The PSOE was also the only party to win seats in every district, the first of only three times since the Spanish transition to democracy that this has happened—the other two being PP results in the 2000 and 2011 elections.

The AP-PDP coalition had a major breakthrough, gaining a substantial portion of UCD previous support, displacing it as the main party to the right-of-centre in Spain and becoming the country's main opposition party. Despite only topping the polls in Galicia, its results elsewhere where still considered impressive for a party that, in the 1979 election, had only obtained 6% of the vote and 9 seats. It obtained 107 seats—despite opinion polls predicting that it would be well-below the 100-seat mark—and climbed up to 5.5 million votes. It did not win any seats, however, in the districts of Ceuta and Melilla, which essentially worked under a FPTP system. The AP-UCD-PDP coalition in the Basque Country won 2 seats, 1 each for Álava and Biscay, being left out from Gipuzkoa. It would also be the only one of three times that AP and its successor, the PP, would win a seat in the district of Girona.

The PCE suffered from PSOE's growth, falling from 23 seats to 4—a loss of 82.6%—and losing 1.1 million votes to 850,000 —a loss of 60%. Furthermore, it fell to 4.02% of the share, from 10.8% in 1979. As a result of not reaching the required 5% threshold and 5 seats to obtain a parliamentary group in Congress of its own, the PCE was forced into the Mixed Group, with the fear of becoming an extraparliamentary party at the next election remaining for the entire legislature. On the other hand, nationalist parties such as PNV and CiU benefitted from the UCD's collapse and enlarged its political representation. CiU gained 4 seats for a total of 12, placing among the top two in Catalonia, a first in a general election since 1977.

Aftermath

Congress Speaker Gregorio Peces-Barba (PSOE), in an uncommon gesture, did not cast a ballot and maintained strict neutrality, as his party's lopsized majority all but guaranteed González's election. The 202-strong PSOE absolute majority would come to be known as the "roller" (rodillo in Spanish), in reference to the party's overwhelming parliamentary power. Any bill submitted by González' government was assured to be approved by Congress, with the parliamentary process of law-making and approval turning into a mere formality.

Legacy
The October 1982 general election led to a major reconfiguration of the Spanish political scene. While institutionally, the Spanish transition to democracy ended in December 1978 after the approval of the 1978 Constitution in referendum and its subsequent adoption, historically the transition is considered to have ended with the 1982 election. The threat of a military coup d'etat after the failed 23-F coup had effectively ended, after preparations for the 27-O coup attempt were foiled. The election's aftermath ensured a lasting political stability that would favour the implementation of reforms that would definitely settle democracy in Spain. Furthermore, the exceptionally high turnout (80%) was seen as a strong endorsement by the Spanish people on the democratic system, and the political earthquake resulting from the election was deemed as the Spaniards' desire to break up with the past and to look into the future, rallying behind the PSOE and the "for change" premises it had campaigned for.

The UCD, the political party which had led the country into the transition from Francisco Franco's dictatorship into a fledgling democracy, was not only ousted from power, but almost entirely decimated in the election. From the 35% of the share and 168 seats it had obtained in 1979 it was reduced to a mere 7% and 11 seats. It had lost 4.9 million votes in its last three years in power (roughly 80% of its 1979 voter base) and was left as a third party with no ability to influence the government. As a result, the UCD, which had been in office since its inception in 1977 until December 1982, effectively ceased to exist as in February 1983, when its leadership decided to dissolve the party as it was unable to cope with the mounting debts. Its collapse was seen with time as the result of the voters' perception of it not acting with consistency, clarity and effectiveness, and because of the internal party division and infighting that plagued the UCD's final time in power.

The PSOE won the election in a landslide with a large absolute majority of seats and roughly half (48.1%) of the vote share. With 202 out of the 350 seats at stake in the Congress and 134 out of the 208 electable seats in the Senate, it won roughly 60% of the seats in each chamber, a record result not surpassed ever since by any political party. Its 10,127,392-vote result, comprising 38% of the voting-able electorate at the time, was not reached by any party until the 2000 general election held 18 years later, when the PP obtained 10,321,178 (however, as the voting-able electorate was much larger in 2000, that result was not as lopsized in percentage terms as it was in 1982). For the next decade, the Socialists would dominate Spanish politics with no other party having a realistic chance of forming government, leading some commentators to suggest that Spain had moved to a dominant-party system. Eventually, the PSOE would not be seriously challenged until 1993, when they were reduced to a minority government, remaining in power for another 3 years until 1996. To date, Felipe González' 1982–1996 stay in power (four terms comprising 14 years) remains the longest period of continuous government by a democratically elected PM, with governments ever since usually having shorter durations of 8 years (two terms).

The People's Alliance became the major opposition party as a result of this election, having been a minor party in the 1977–1982 period. It replaced the UCD as the main non-socialist party in Spain, and has maintained this position for most of the last four decades. However, despite its position as the main alternative to the PSOE, its perceived right-wing stance, subsequent internal crises and leadership changes, as well as the PSOE's enduring popularity until the early 1990s, ensured the party would remain electorally stagnant throughout the decade. AP would also face the direct competition of Suárez's CDS in the 1986–1989 period, which for some time was even expected to surpass AP as the PSOE's main rival. The party's position would not improve until its relaunch as the People's Party in 1989 and the leadership of José María Aznar, which would eventually led to the establishment in 1993 of a two-party system in Spain, and in the PP's rise to power in 1996.

Notes

References

General
1982 in Spain
1982
October 1982 events in Europe